Karlheinz Kaske (April 19, 1928 in Essen – September 27, 1998) was a German manager and CEO of the Siemens AG from 1981 to 1992.

Kaske studied Physics at RWTH Aachen and joined Siemens in 1950, when he became an engineer in the Siemens factory at Karlsruhe. Later he was a lecturer for electrical engineering at RWTH Aachen and he continued academic teaching during his following years in Siemens’ development department. In 1975, Kaske became a member of the board of directors and since 1977 he was director of the power engineering department. He succeeded Bernhard Plettner as CEO in 1981. He passed the office to Heinrich von Pierer in October 1992.

References
Shaping the Future. The Siemens Entrepreneurs 1847–2018. Ed. Siemens Historical Institute, Hamburg 2018, .

External links 
Presidents and Chief Executive Officers of Siemens AG

1998 deaths
1928 births
Engineers from Essen
German electrical engineers
People from the Rhine Province
Siemens people
RWTH Aachen University alumni
Academic staff of the Technical University of Munich